Vĩnh Long is a province located in the Mekong Delta of southern Vietnam. Its capital is Vĩnh Long. Vĩnh Long (spelled 永隆 in the former Hán Nôm writing system) is a Sino-Vietnamese name, translating as "eternal prosperity."

Administrative history
Modern-day Vĩnh Long was part of Long Hồ dinh (barrack, 營) established by the Nguyễn lords in 1732, comprising the provinces of Bến Tre, Trà Vinh, and parts of Cần Thơ.

The area saw some of the heaviest fighting between the Tây Sơn brothers and the Nguyễn lords in the late 18th century; in 1784 Nguyễn Huệ defeated Siamese forces aiding Nguyễn Ánh at the Mang Thít River.

In 1951, the Southern Resistance Administrative Committee of the Democratic Republic of Vietnam merged Vĩnh Long and Trà Vinh provinces into Vĩnh Trà province. Vinh Tra existed until 1954 (however, as North Vietnam never administered the area for a significant period of time, this arrangement was not enforced). In 1957, the South Vietnam formed Vĩnh Long province, consisting of six districts: Châu Thành, Chợ Lách (now part of Bến Tre province), Tam Bình, Bình Minh, Sa Đéc, and  Lấp Vò. In 1961, Cái Nhum District was split from Chợ Lách. Đức Tôn District and Đức Thành District were added in 1962, but joined the newly formed Sa Đéc province in 1966.  As of 1975, the province had seven districts: Châu Thành, Chợ Lách, Tam Bình, Bình Minh, Minh Đức, Trà Ôn, and Vũng Liêm.

After the fall of South Vietnam, the Socialist Republic of Vietnam merged Vĩnh Long with Trà Vinh province, forming Cửu Long province in 1976. In 1991, Cửu Long was again split into Vĩnh Long and Trà Vinh. At the time of the split,  Vĩnh Long province consisted of one city (Vĩnh Long) and five districts: Long Hồ, Vũng Liêm, Bình Minh, Tam Bình, and Trà Ôn.

In 1992, Mang Thít District was re-split from Long Hồ District. In 2007, Bình Tân District was created.

Geography
Lying between the Hau and Tien rivers in the center of the Mekong Delta, Vĩnh Long is a province well known for fishing.

Administrative divisions
Vĩnh Long is subdivided into eight district-level sub-divisions:

 6 districts:

 Bình Tân
 Long Hồ
 Mang Thít
 Tam Bình
 Trà Ôn
 Vũng Liêm

 1 district-level town:
 Bình Minh
 1 provincial city:
 Vĩnh Long (capital)

They are further subdivided into five commune-level towns (or townlets), 94 communes, and 10 wards.

Economy

Prawns and the Basa and Tra catfish are among the many types of fish that exist in abundance in the waters of Vĩnh Long. Its rich, fertile soil makes Vĩnh Long an ideal location for the growing of many exotic and delicious fruits, including the strange-looking mangosteen, the spikey rambutan and the pungently fragrant durian. Because of Vĩnh Long's extensive network of waterways, these fruits and many other items can be purchased for mere pennies from the huge water-based squadron of floating merchants.

Traveling by water is a common practice here for such mundane tasks as grocery shopping as well as getting to restaurants and tourist attractions located on small islets accessible only by boat. Tourist infrastructure is still in its infancy here, but comfortable lodging and great food can be had for very reasonable prices.

Transportation

Notable Vĩnh Long residents

Võ Văn Kiệt
Petrus Ký
Ngô Đình Thục
Hoài Lâm

References

External links

 
Territorial disputes of Vietnam
Territorial disputes of Cambodia
States and territories established in 1957
Provinces of Vietnam